The Political Bureau of the Central Committee of FRELIMO was a Politburo which briefly assumed the responsibilities of the President of the People's Republic of Mozambique between 19 October 1986 and 6 November 1986 following the death of Samora Machel and the election of Joaquim Chissano to succeed him. The Politburo was reformed in 1989 at the FRELIMO Party 5th Congress.

Membership in 1986 
Marcelino dos Santos
Joaquim Chissano 
Alberto Chipande 
Armando Guebuza
Jorge Rebelo
Mariano de Araújo Matsinhe
Sebastião Marcos Mabote
Jacinto Soares Veloso
Mário da Graça Machungo
José Óscar Monteiro

See also
List of heads of state of Mozambique

References

Presidents of Mozambique